"Famous" is an English language hit by Swedish girl group Play, taken from the album Under My Skin (released on 21 April 2010). It is the only number-one single for the group on the Swedish Singles Chart, and their only top 10 hit since Play began in 2001.

The song was released as a one-track digital download on 15 February 2010, while on 16 February it was released as a two-track CD single including the song "Girls" as a B-side. It debuted on the Swedish Singles Chart for the week ending 19 February 2010 at number five, reaching number one the following week and staying there for one week. After five consecutive weeks on the chart, it left for one week before returning for two more, giving it a seven-week run.

Background
In late 2009, as part of the Swedish television program Made in Sweden, the show's judges tried to reunite the Swedish pop group Play which split up in 2005. Three members from the original group were due to take part: Fanny Hamlin, Anaïs Lameche and Rosanna Munter, but Rosanna dropped out two weeks prior to filming. After a search for a third member, Sanne Karlsson, a demo recorder for one of their songs, was chosen. She joined the band and the cameras followed the group throughout the four-episode program in their journey to get back in shape for the music industry. By the last episode of the show on 11 February 2010, "Famous", the show's theme song, was announced as the group's first single since 2004.

Track listing
Digital download
 "Famous" (Radio Version) – 2:52

CD single
 "Famous" – 2:52
 "Girls" – 3:12

Release history

Charts

Big Time Rush version

"Famous" was recorded by American pop group Big Time Rush from the international version of their debut studio album BTR. It was also included in the Best of Season 1 extended play. It was played in its entirety for the first time immediately following the debut of the episode "Big Time Fever" on 26 June 2010. The song was released on 29 June 2010 as third promotional single from the soundtrack. The music video was released on 25 June 2010 and was recorded in both a studio and at a concert held in Times Square on 10 June 2010. Commercially, the song only lasted one week on the Bubbling Under Hot 100 chart and Heatseekers Songs chart.

Charts

References

External links
 

2010 singles
Number-one singles in Sweden
Big Time Rush songs
Songs written by Andreas Carlsson
Songs written by Desmond Child
2010 songs
Electropop songs
Dance-rock songs